Antoinette Kuiters (born 11 September 1939) is a South African gymnast. She competed in five events at the 1960 Summer Olympics.

References

1939 births
Living people
South African female artistic gymnasts
Olympic gymnasts of South Africa
Gymnasts at the 1960 Summer Olympics
Sportspeople from Schiedam